Mendes is a common Portuguese and Galician surname, originally a patronymic, meaning Son of Mendo or Son of Mem.  The Spanish form of the name is Méndez.

People

General

António Lopes Mendes (1835-1894), Portuguese explorer and writer
António Rosa Mendes (born 1954), Portuguese academic
Benjamin Mendes da Costa (1803–1868), English merchant and philanthropist
Emanuel Mendes da Costa (1717–1791), English botanist, naturalist, philosopher
Fernão Mendes Pinto (c. 1509–1583), Portuguese adventurer, explorer and writer
Ian Mendes (born 1976), Canadian sports broadcaster
Jacob Mendes Da Costa (born 1833–1900), American surgeon
José Fernando Ferreira Mendes (born 1965), Portuguese physicist
Luís Mendes de Vasconcellos (died 1623), Portuguese Grand Master of the Knights Hospitaller
Moses da Costa (full name Moses Mendes da Costa; died 1747), English banker
Pedro Pedrosa Mendes, Portuguese scientist
Raimundo Teixeira Mendes (1855–1927), Brazilian philosopher and mathematician

Arts
Bob Mendes (1928–2021), Belgian accountant and writer of detective stories
Camila Mendes (born 1994), American actress
Catulle Mendès (1841–1909), French poet
Eva Mendes  (born 1974), American actress, model, singer and homeware and clothing designer
Louis Mendes (born 1940), American photographer
Manuel Mendes (c. 1547–1605), Portuguese composer
Matthieu Mendès (born 1982), French singer, songwriter, music producer and musician guitarist
Murilo Mendes (1901–1975), Brazilian poet
Paulo Mendes da Rocha (1928–2021), Brazilian architect
Sam Mendes (born 1965), British stage and film director
Sara Mendes da Costa (born c. 1966), British voice actress
Sérgio Mendes (born 1941), Brazilian musician
Shawn Mendes (born 1998), Canadian musician
Simon Mendes da Costa, British playwright

Politics and military
Aristides de Sousa Mendes (1885–1954), Portuguese diplomat and Righteous Among The Nations
Chico Mendes (1944–1988), Brazilian environmental activist
Duarte Mendes (born 1947), Portuguese captain and singer
Elvira Mendes (c. 996–1022), Queen of Léon
Francisco Mendes (1939–1978), Guinea-Bissau politician
José Mendes Cabeçadas (1883–1965), Portuguese military and politician
Luís Filipe Castro Mendes (born 1950), Portuguese politician
Luís Marques Mendes (born 1957), Portuguese politician
Pierre Mendès-France (1907–1982), French politician

Religion
Abraham Pereira Mendes (1825–1893), English rabbi and educator
Henry Pereira Mendes (1852–1937), American rabbi
João Mendes de Silva (1420–1482) known as Amadeus of Portugal, Portuguese beatified Franciscan friar
Luciano Mendes de Almeida (1930–2006), Brazilian Jesuit priest and bishop
Wanigamuni Miguel Mendes Wimalarathna (1823-1890), Sri Lankan Sinhala Buddhist orator
Frederick de Sola Mendes (1850-1927), American rabbi and writer

Sports
Carlos Mendes (born 1980), United States footballer
Cleiton Mendes Dos Santos (born 1978), Brazilian footballer
Daniel Mendes (footballer, born 1981), Brazilian footballer
David Mendes da Silva (born 1982), Dutch footballer
Jorge Mendes (born 1966), Portuguese football agent
Junior Mendes (born 1976), English footballer
Pedro Mendes (born 1979), Portuguese footballer
Rodrigo Mendes (born 1975), Brazilian footballer
Rosa Mendes (born 1979), ring name of Canadian professional wrestler Milena Roucka
Sandro Mendes (born 1977), Portuguese footballer
Tiago Mendes (born 1981), Portuguese footballer
Tony Mendes (born 1977), American bull rider
Elvis Mendes (born 1997), Cape Verdean footballer
Scott Mendes (born 1969), American bull rider

See also
Benveniste/Mendes family were prominent in 11th to 15th century France, Portugal and Spain.
Mendis, Sinhala surname which derives from "Mendes"

Portuguese-language surnames
Patronymic surnames
Sephardic surnames